Szigethalom is a town in Pest county, Hungary.

Twin towns – sister cities

Szigethalom is twinned with:
 Fiľakovo, Slovakia
 Jaworzno, Poland
 Söderhamn, Sweden
 Nagykikinda, Serbia

References

External links 
 
 Street map 

Populated places in Pest County